Colwellia meonggei is a Gram-negative, non-spore-forming aerobic and motile bacterium from the genus of Colwellia which has been isolated from the sea squirt Halocynthia roretzi from the South sea in Korea.

References

Alteromonadales
Bacteria described in 2014